Willy Marckwald (1864, Jakobskirch, Germany – 1942, Rolândia, Brazil) was a German chemist. </ref>

Biography

Marckwald studied at Berlin's Friedrich-Wilhelms-Universität and received there from the First Chemical Institute in 1886 his Promotierung under A. W. Hofmann with a dissertation on organic chemistry entitled Beitrag zur Kenntniss der Thialdehyde und Thialdine.

By his research on furans, Marckwald received his Habilitation in a very short time in 1889 under the supervision of A. W. Hofmann at Friedrich-Wilhelms-Universität Berlin. In 1899 Marckwald became one of the department heads at the Second Chemical Institute. He held this Privatdozent-level position until his age-related retirement in 1930.

From 1928 to 1931 he was the board chair of the German Chemical Society.

In 1890 Marckwald married Margarete Salomon (1871–1908). Their marriage produced two sons, Friedrich (1892–1917), who died in World War I as a naval aviator, and Johann (1902–1986). In 1936 Willy Marckwald, with his son Johann and his daughter-in-law Prisca, became immigrants in Brazil.

Scientific work
From the starting point of his Promotierung dissertation and Habilitation, Marckwald developed a wide interest in all the fields of chemistry of his era. In heterocyclic chemistry, building upon the research done on Gabriel synthesis, he developed a method for synthesis of aziridines from β-halogen-amines. This ring closure method, known as the Gabriel-Marckwald reaction, allows the preparation of heterocyclic amines that are n-membered, where n=3,4,5,6, or 7.
In so far as possible, Marckwald sold the patent rights for use in industry. On this topic, he also wrote monographs of general interest.

At the Second Chemical Institute, Marckwald did pioneering research on kinetic resolution and stereoselective synthesis.

Three of his outstanding achievements were:
 1899, Kinetic resolution by synthetic means;
 1900, Methods for enantiomer separation by crystallization of derivatives;
 1904, Enantioselective chemical synthesis (Asymmetrische Katalyse).

At the Second Chemical Institute under Landolt's direction, Marckwald beginning in 1900 turned increasingly toward theory but also to the inorganic chemistry of radioactive compounds. He collaborated on Landolt's sections in the textbook Graham-Otto's ausführlichem Lehrbuch der Chemie. From 5 metric tons of uranium ore, in 1902 Marckwald succeeded in isolating 3 milligrams of polonium, which he provisionally (vorläufig) named radio-tellurium. In 1904 he published a monograph on radioactivity.

In 1911 Marckwald and Alexander Smith Russell published evidence suggesting that the radioactive thorium isotope 230Th and ionium are identical.

Honors and awards

 1916 — special honor from the German Chemical Society
 1919 — appointment as honorary professor of inorganic chemistry at the Königlichen Technischen Hochschule Charlottenburg

References

External links
 Archivdaten der Humboldt-Universität
 
 zeitgenössische Unterlagen aus Zeit der Weimarer Republik, Dankesschreiben des Rektors Dezember 1934

1864 births
1942 deaths
19th-century German chemists
German biochemists
People from Polkowice County
20th-century German chemists